The 1983 Penn State Nittany Lions football team represented the Pennsylvania State University in the 1983 NCAA Division I-A football season. The team was coached by Joe Paterno and played its home games in Beaver Stadium in University Park, Pennsylvania.

Schedule

Roster

Post season

NFL Draft
Eight Nittany Lions were drafted in the 1984 NFL Draft.

References

Penn State
Penn State Nittany Lions football seasons
Aloha Bowl champion seasons
Penn State Nittany Lions football